Arthur Reid may refer to:

Arthur "Duke" Reid (1915–1975), Jamaican DJ
Arthur Reid (figure skater), in 1997 U.S. Figure Skating Championships
Arthur Reid (publisher) (fl. 1890s–1910s), partner of James MacCallum Smith
Arthur Reid (golfer) (1882–1959), professional golfer
Arthur Reid (bowls) (fl. 1930s), Canadian lawn bowls international

See also
Arthur Reed (disambiguation)
Arthur Read (disambiguation)